The 2018 Lale Cup was a professional tennis tournament played on outdoor hard courts. It was the sixth edition of the tournament and was part of the 2018 ITF Women's Circuit. It took place in Istanbul, Turkey, on 9–15 April 2018.

Singles main draw entrants

Seeds 

 1 Rankings as of 2 April 2018.

Other entrants 
The following players received a wildcard into the singles main draw:
  Berfu Cengiz
  Selin Övünç
  İpek Öz
  Pemra Özgen

The following players received entry using protected rankings:
  Rebecca Šramková

The following players received entry from the qualifying draw:
  Olga Doroshina
  Anastasia Gasanova
  Ilona Georgiana Ghioroaie
  Natalija Kostić

The following player received entry as a lucky loser:
  Sara Tomic

Champions

Singles

 Sabina Sharipova def.  Elena Rybakina, 7–6(7–0), 6–4

Doubles
 
 Ayla Aksu /  Harriet Dart def.  Olga Doroshina /  Anastasia Potapova, 6–4, 7–6(7–3)

External links 
 2018 Lale Cup at ITFtennis.com

2018 ITF Women's Circuit
2018 in Turkish tennis
Lale Cup
2018 in Turkish women's sport